Harlan Township may refer to the following townships in the United States:

 Harlan Township, Fayette County, Iowa
 Harlan Township, Decatur County, Kansas
 Harlan Township, Warren County, Ohio